Victor Wong (September 24, 1906 – April 7, 1972) was a Chinese American actor. While Wong appeared in numerous films through the 1930s and 1940s, they were largely small uncredited parts. His biggest role was as Charlie the Cook in the movie King Kong (1933) and Son of Kong (1933). Wong's most memorable scene came in King Kong when he finds evidence that natives from Skull Island have been aboard the ship Venture, resulting in the kidnapping of heroine Ann Darrow.  As Charlie the Cook, Wong yells, "All hands on deck! Everybody on deck!"  This causes panic aboard ship which begins the quest for Ann's whereabouts and the discovery of King Kong.  The Charlie character in the sequel Son of Kong was more prominent to the story and included significantly more screen time for Wong.

Filmography

Shanghai Express (1932) - Chinese Officer (uncredited)
 War Correspondent (1932) - Wu Sun
King Kong (1933) - Charlie the Chinese Cook (uncredited)
White Woman (1933) - Waiter (uncredited)
Son of Kong (1933) - Charlie - Chinese Cook
Vagabond Lady (1935) - Japanese Fisherman (uncredited)
Without Regret (1935) - Soldier (uncredited)
The Leathernecks Have Landed (1936) - Cheng (uncredited)
Hair-Trigger Casey (1936) - Lee Fin - Karney's Enemy
Brilliant Marriage (1936) - Wong
Shadow of Chinatown (1936) - Bystander [Ch. 2] (uncredited)
Lost Horizon (1937) - Bandit Leader (uncredited)
Waikiki Wedding (1937) - Gardener (uncredited)
Dangerous Holiday (1937) - Charlie, Chinese Boy (uncredited)
Thank You, Mr. Moto (1937) - Street Peddler (uncredited)
The Beloved Brat (1938) - Gardener (uncredited)
The Fighting Devil Dogs (1938) - Mikichan (uncredited)
Shadows Over Shanghai (1938) - Wu Chang
Too Hot to Handle (1938)
North of Shanghai (1939) - Cop
Second Fiddle (1939) - Chinese Radio Broadcaster (uncredited)
Mr. Moto Takes a Vacation (1939) - Restaurant Proprietor (uncredited)
 The Taming of the West (1939) - Cholly Wong
Barricade (1939) - Second Bandit (uncredited)
Phantom of Chinatown (1940) - Charley Won (uncredited)
No, No, Nanette (1940) - John, Tom's Houseboy (uncredited)
The Phantom Submarine (1940) - Willie Ming
Passage from Hong Kong (1941) - Rickshaw Driver (uncredited)
A Yank on the Burma Road (1942) - Chinese Man at Bridge (uncredited)
Remember Pearl Harbor (1942) - Japanese Junior Officer (uncredited)
Wake Island (1942) - Japanese Commander (uncredited)
Flying Tigers (1942) - Chinese Passenger (uncredited)
Destination Unknown (1942) - Trainman (uncredited)
The Adventures of Smilin' Jack (1943) - Radio Operator in Hong Kong [Chs. 5-6] (uncredited)
Mission to Moscow (1943) - Japanese Diplomat (uncredited)
Dragon Seed (1944) - Japanese Officer (uncredited)
Betrayal from the East (1945) - Joe (uncredited) (final film role)

External links

1906 births
1972 deaths
American people of Chinese descent
American male film actors
20th-century American male actors
RKO Pictures contract players